D420 is a state road in the northern outskirts of the city of Dubrovnik, Croatia, connecting the Port of Gruž to the D8 state road.

The road, as well as all other state roads in Croatia, is managed and maintained by Hrvatske Ceste, state owned company.

Road junctions and populated areas

Sources

State roads in Croatia
Transport in Dubrovnik-Neretva County